Harry Anthony Jagielski (December 25, 1931 – October 9, 1993) was an American football player who played offensive and defensive tackle in the National Football League for the Washington Redskins and the Chicago Cardinals. He also played in the American Football League for the Boston Patriots and the Oakland Raiders. Jagielski played college football at Indiana University and was drafted in the seventh round of the 1954 NFL Draft.

External links
Remember the AFL

1931 births
1993 deaths
American football defensive tackles
American football offensive tackles
Players of American football from Pennsylvania
Boston Patriots players
Chicago Cardinals players
Indiana Hoosiers football players
Oakland Raiders players
Sportspeople from Pennsylvania
Washington Redskins players
American Football League players